Otto Martler (born 14 April 1987) is a Swedish footballer who as a goalkeeper.

External links

1987 births
Living people
Association football goalkeepers
Falkenbergs FF players
IFK Norrköping players
GAIS players
Halmstads BK players
Swedish footballers
Allsvenskan players
Superettan players
Högaborgs BK players